Ellerton Abbey (also known as Ellerton Abbey House) is an historic building and estate in Ellerton Abbey, North Yorkshire, England. It was built around 1830 for the Fore Erle-Drax family, and has been designated a Grade II listed building by Historic England.

As of 2021, the building is occupied by Ellerton Abbey Antiques and Mrs Pumphrey's Tearoom, the latter in reference to the character in the original version of the BBC television series All Creatures Great and Small who lived there with her spoiled Pekingese dog Tricki-Woo. Filming took place inside the house, which was named Barlby Grange in the series, and in its grounds.

Drax family
Following the Dissolution of the Monasteries the Priory became the property of a series of people until it was purchased in the 1690s by Col. Henry Drax, a wealthy slave owner and sugar planter, of Drax Hall in Barbados, who was looking for an English estate which would produce £10,000 per annum. His heir was his nephew Thomas Shatterden, of Pope's Common, Hertfordshire, son of his sister, who in accordance with the bequest adopted the surname Drax in lieu of his patronymic. His eldest son and heir was Henry Drax (c.1693–1755), a Member of Parliament and a favourite of the Prince of Wales, who married Elizabeth Ernle, heiress of Charborough House in Dorset, which today remains the residence of his descendant Richard Drax, MP.

John Samuel Wanley Swabridge Erle-Drax built the house for his wife, Jane Frances, around 1830.

Gallery

See also
Listed buildings in England

References

1830 establishments in England
Houses completed in 1830
Grade II listed buildings in North Yorkshire
Country houses in North Yorkshire